Howard Waring French (born October 14, 1957) is an American journalist, author, and photographer, as well as professor since 2008 at the Columbia University Graduate School of Journalism. Prior to re-entering academia, he was a longtime foreign correspondent and senior writer with The New York Times.

Biography
French was a university instructor in the Ivory Coast in the 1980s before becoming a reporter. He has reported extensively on the political affairs of Western and Central Africa. These reports were the basis for the book A Continent for the Taking.

French has also reported on the political and social affairs in China, where he covered the growth of civil society, the government crackdown of dissent in the Dongzhou protests of 2005, and the Sichuan earthquake of 2008, among other topics.  His most recent work for The New York Times was centered on China where he was the paper's Shanghai bureau chief, from 2003 to 2008.

French was New York Times bureau chief for the Caribbean and Central America from 1990 to 1994; he covered Haiti, Cuba, Nicaragua, El Salvador, and numerous other countries. He was one of the newspaper's first black correspondents.

From 1994 to 1998, French covered West and Central Africa for the Times, reporting on wars in Liberia, Sierra Leone and Central Africa, with particular attention to the fall of the longtime dictator of Zaire Mobutu Sese Seko.

From 1998 to 2003, French was Tokyo Bureau Chief for the Times, covering Japan and the Koreas.

In addition to his native English, French speaks Mandarin, French, Spanish, and Japanese. He became Tokyo bureau chief for the Times in 1999, after a year studying Japanese at the University of Hawaiʻi at Mānoa. He has written frequently for The New York Review of Books and also contributed to The Atlantic and to "The Guardian Longreads" and many other publications.

In addition to covering China as Shanghai Bureau Chief for the Times, French worked as a weekly columnist on regional affairs for the International Herald Tribune.
French is the author of " Born in Blackness: Africa, Africans, and the Making of the Modern World, 1471 to the Second World War " (Norton/Liveright, 2021), his fifth book. His immediate previous book was the 2017 title, "Everything Under the Heavens: How China's Past Helps Shape its Push for Global Power",  French is also an internationally exhibited documentary photographer, whose multi-year project called "Disappearing Shanghai", photographing the rapidly shrinking old quarters of Shanghai, was shown in Asia, Europe and the United States. A book containing this work, Disappearing Shanghai: Photographs and Poems of an Intimate Way of Life, was published in 2012, in collaboration with the novelist and poet Qiu Xiaolong.

French is a member of the board of the Columbia Journalism Review and recent past president of IRIN (since renamed as The New Humanitarian), a not-for-profit news agency that focuses on the humanitarian sector, based in Geneva, Switzerland. He writes a weekly column on international affairs for Foreign Policy.

Fellowships:

1999 Jefferson Fellow, East-West Society, Honolulu, Hawaii
2011 Open Societies Foundation fellow

Honors

2022 Winner, MAAH Stone Book Award for Non-Fiction for Born in Blackness: Africa, Africans, and the Making of the Modern World, 1471 to the Second World War
2022 Winner, Hurston Wright Award for Non-Fiction for Born in Blackness: Africa, Africans, and the Making of the Modern World, 1471 to the Second World War
2016 Professor of the Year, Columbia University Graduate School of Journalism
2005 Finalist, Hurston Wright Award for Non-Fiction for A Continent for the Taking: The Tragedy and Hope of Africa
2004 Honorary Doctorate - University of Maryland, for commentary on East Asia

Works
A Continent for the Taking: The Tragedy and Hope of Africa, Knopf, 2004.
China's Second Continent: How a Million Migrants are Building a New Empire in Africa, Knopf 2014. 
Everything Under the Heavens: How the Past Helps Shape China's Push for Global Power, Alfred A. Knopf, 2017. 
Born in Blackness: Africa, Africans, and the Making of the Modern World, 1471 to the Second World War, Liveright, 2021.

References

External links
Official website
Biography
A Glimpse of the World - Howard French's photos on Flickr

1957 births
Living people
20th-century American journalists
20th-century African-American people
21st-century African-American artists
21st-century American journalists
21st-century American photographers
African-American journalists
African-American photographers
American columnists
American male journalists
American newspaper reporters and correspondents
American nonprofit executives
Columbia University Graduate School of Journalism faculty
Journalists from Washington, D.C.
The New York Times columnists
The New York Times writers
Writers about China